Freak, in comics, may refer to:
 A member of DC Comic's Doom Patrol
 Freak (Image Comics), an enemy of Spawn
 Freak (Marvel Comics), the name of three Marvel Comics characters
 Freaks (manga), a 2002 Japanese comics series
 Freex, a 1993 Malibu Comics series

See also
 Freak (disambiguation)